= November 1991 Civic Democratic Party leadership election =

Czechoslovak political party election

- 23 November 1991
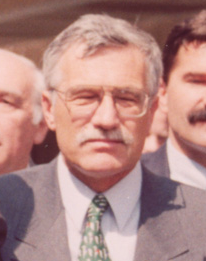
Candidate	Václav Klaus
Electoral vote	327
Percentage	95%
Leader of ODS before election
Václav Klaus
Elected Leader of ODS
Václav Klaus

A leadership election for the Civic Democratic Party (ODS) was held in Czechoslovakia on 23 November 1991. Václav Klaus was confirmed as the leader of ODS. 327 delegates voted for him while 14 voted against him.

== Results ==
Candidate	Votes	%
Václav Klaus	327	95.89
Against	14	4.11
Total	341	100
